Labeobarbus petitjeani is a species of ray-finned fish in the genus Labeobarbus from the upper Senegal River basin in Guinea.

References 

 

petitjeani
Fish described in 1962